Roots of the median nerve may refer to:

 Lateral root of median nerve
 Medial root of median nerve